Abiotic stress is the negative impact of non-living factors on the living organisms in a specific environment.  The non-living variable must influence the environment beyond its normal range of variation to adversely affect the population performance or individual physiology of the organism in a significant way.

Whereas a biotic stress would include living disturbances such as fungi or harmful insects, abiotic stress factors, or stressors, are naturally occurring, often intangible and inanimate factors such as intense sunlight, temperature or wind that may cause harm to the plants and animals in the area affected. Abiotic stress is essentially unavoidable. Abiotic stress affects animals, but plants are especially dependent, if not solely dependent, on environmental factors, so it is particularly constraining.  Abiotic stress is the most harmful factor concerning the growth and productivity of crops worldwide.  Research has also shown that abiotic stressors are at their most harmful when they occur together, in combinations of abiotic stress factors.

Examples
Abiotic stress comes in many forms.  The most common of the stressors are the easiest for people to identify, but there are many other, less recognizable abiotic stress factors which affect environments constantly.

The most basic stressors include:  
 High winds
 Extreme temperatures
 Drought
 Flood
 Other natural disasters, such as tornadoes and wildfires.
 Cold
 Heat
 Nutrient deficiency

Lesser-known stressors generally occur on a smaller scale. They include: poor edaphic conditions like rock content and pH levels, high radiation, compaction, contamination, and other, highly specific conditions like rapid rehydration during seed germination.

Effects
Abiotic stress, as a natural part of every ecosystem, will affect organisms in a variety of ways.  Although these effects may be either beneficial or detrimental, the location of the area is crucial in determining the extent of the impact that abiotic stress will have.  The higher the latitude of the area affected, the greater the impact of abiotic stress will be on that area.  So, a taiga or boreal forest is at the mercy of whatever abiotic stress factors may come along, while tropical zones are much less susceptible to such stressors.

Benefits
One example of  a situation where abiotic stress plays a constructive role in an ecosystem is in natural wildfires.  While they can be a human safety hazard, it is productive for these ecosystems to burn out every once in a while so that new organisms can begin to grow and thrive. Even though it is healthy for an ecosystem, a wildfire can still be considered an abiotic stressor, because it puts an obvious stress on individual organisms within the area.  Every tree that is scorched and each bird nest that is devoured is a sign of the abiotic stress.  On the larger scale, though, natural wildfires are positive manifestations of abiotic stress.

What also needs to be taken into account when looking for benefits of abiotic stress, is that one phenomenon may not affect an entire ecosystem in the same way.  While a flood will kill most plants living low on the ground in a certain area, if there is rice there, it will thrive in the wet conditions. Another example of this is in phytoplankton and zooplankton.  The same types of conditions are usually considered stressful for these two types of organisms.  They act very similarly when exposed to ultraviolet light and most toxins, but at elevated temperatures the phytoplankton reacts negatively, while the thermophilic zooplankton reacts positively to the increase in temperature. The two may be living in the same environment, but an increase in temperature of the area would prove stressful only for one of the organisms.

Lastly, abiotic stress has enabled species to grow, develop, and evolve, furthering natural selection as it picks out the weakest of a group of organisms.  Both plants and animals have evolved mechanisms allowing them to survive extremes.

Detriments
The most obvious detriment concerning abiotic stress involves farming.  It has been claimed by one study that abiotic stress causes the most crop loss of any other factor and that most major crops are reduced in their yield by more than 50% from their potential yield.

Because abiotic stress is widely considered a detrimental effect, the research on this branch of the issue is extensive. For more information on the harmful effects of abiotic stress, see the sections below on plants and animals.

In plants
A plant's first line of defense against abiotic stress is in its roots.  If the soil holding the plant is healthy and biologically diverse, the plant will have a higher chance of surviving stressful conditions.

The plant responses to stress are dependent on the tissue or organ affected by the stress. For example, transcriptional responses to stress are tissue or cell specific in roots and are quite different depending on the stress involved.

One of the primary responses to abiotic stress such as high salinity is the disruption of the Na+/K+ ratio in the cytoplasm of the plant cell.  High concentrations of Na+, for example, can decrease the capacity for the plant to take up water and also alter enzyme and transporter functions.  Evolved adaptations to efficiently restore cellular ion homeostasis have led to a wide variety of stress tolerant plants.

Facilitation, or the positive interactions between different species of plants, is an intricate web of association in a natural environment.  It is how plants work together.  In areas of high stress, the level of facilitation is especially high as well.  This could possibly be because the plants need a stronger network to survive in a harsher environment, so their interactions between species, such as cross-pollination or mutualistic actions, become more common to cope with the severity of their habitat.

Plants also adapt very differently from one another, even from a plant living in the same area.  When a group of different plant species was prompted by a variety of different stress signals, such as drought or cold, each plant responded uniquely.  Hardly any of the responses were similar, even though the plants had become accustomed to exactly the same home environment.

Serpentine soils (media with low concentrations of nutrients and high concentrations of heavy metals) can be a source of abiotic stress. Initially, the absorption of toxic metal ions is limited by cell membrane exclusion. Ions that are absorbed into tissues are sequestered in cell vacuoles. This sequestration mechanism is facilitated by proteins on the vacuole membrane. An example of plants that adapt to serpentine soil are Metallophytes, or hyperaccumulators, as they are known for their ability to absorbed heavy metals using the root-to-shoot translocation (which it will absorb into shoots rather than the plant itself). They're also extinguished for their ability to absorb toxic substances from heavy metals.

Chemical priming has been proposed to increase tolerance to abiotic stresses in crop plants. In this method, which is analogous to vaccination, stress-inducing chemical agents are introduced to the plant in brief doses so that the plant begins preparing defense mechanisms. Thus, when the abiotic stress occurs, the plant has already prepared defense mechanisms that can be activated faster and increase tolerance. Prior exposure to tolerable doses of biotic stresses such as phloem-feeding insect infestation have also been shown to increase tolerance to abiotic stresses in plant

Impact on food production

Abiotic stress mostly affects plants used in agriculture. Some examples of adverse conditions (which may be caused by climate change) are high or low temperatures, drought, salinity, and toxins.

 Rice (Oryza sativa) is a classic example. Rice is a staple food throughout the world, especially in China and India. Rice plants can undergo different types of abiotic stresses, like drought and high salinity. These stress conditions adversely affect rice production. Genetic diversity has been studied among several rice varieties with different genotypes, using molecular markers.
 Chickpea production is affected by drought. Chickpeas are one of the most important foods in the world.
 Wheat is another major crop that is affected by drought: lack of water affects the plant development, and can wither the leaves.
 Maize crops can be affected by high temperature and drought, leading to the loss of maize crops due to poor plant development.
 Soybean is a major source of protein, and its production is also affected by drought.

Salt stress in plants 
Soil salinization, the accumulation of water-soluble salts to levels that negatively impact plant production, is a global phenomenon affecting approximately 831 million hectares of land. More specifically, the phenomenon threatens 19.5% of the world's irrigated agricultural land and 2.1% of the world's non-irrigated (dry-land) agricultural lands. High soil salinity content can be harmful to plants because water-soluble salts can alter osmotic potential gradients and consequently inhibit many cellular functions. For example, high soil salinity content can inhibit the process of photosynthesis by limiting a plant's water uptake; high levels of water-soluble salts in the soil can decrease the osmotic potential of the soil and consequently decrease the difference in water potential between the soil and the plant's roots, thereby limiting electron flow from H2O to P680 in Photosystem II's reaction center.

Over generations, many plants have mutated and built different mechanisms to counter salinity effects. A good combatant of salinity in plants is the hormone ethylene. Ethylene is known for regulating plant growth and development and dealing with stress conditions. Many central membrane proteins in plants, such as ETO2, ERS1 and EIN2, are used for ethylene signaling in many plant growth processes. Mutations in these proteins can lead to heightened salt sensitivity and can limit plant growth. The effects of salinity has been studied on Arabidopsis plants that have mutated ERS1, ERS2, ETR1, ETR2 and EIN4 proteins. These proteins are used for ethylene signaling against certain stress conditions, such as salt and the ethylene precursor ACC is used to suppress any sensitivity to the salt stress.

Phosphate starvation in plants 

Phosphorus (P) is an essential macronutrient required for plant growth and development, but it is present only in limited quantities in most of the world's soil. Plants use P mainly in the form of soluble inorganic phosphates (PO4−−−) but are subject to abiotic stress when there is not enough soluble PO4−−− in the soil. Phosphorus forms insoluble complexes with Ca and Mg in alkaline soils and with Al and Fe in acidic soils that make the phosphorus unavailable for plant roots. When there is limited bioavailable P in the soil, plants show extensive symptoms of abiotic stress, such as short primary roots and more lateral roots and root hairs to make more surface available for phosphate absorption, exudation of organic acids and phosphatase to release phosphates from complex P–containing molecules and make it available for growing plants' organs. It has been shown that PHR1, a MYB-related transcription factor, is a master regulator of P-starvation response in plants. PHR1 also has been shown to regulate extensive remodeling of lipids and metabolites during phosphorus limitation stress

Drought stress 
Drought stress, defined as naturally occurring water deficit, is a main cause of crop losses in agriculture. This is because water is essential for many fundamental processes in plant growth. It has become especially important in recent years to find a way to combat drought stress. A decrease in precipitation and consequent increase in drought are extremely likely in the future due to an increase in global warming. Plants have come up with many mechanisms and adaptations to try and deal with drought stress. One of the leading ways that plants combat drought stress is by closing their stomata. A key hormone regulating stomatal opening and closing is abscisic acid (ABA). Synthesis of ABA causes the ABA to bind to receptors. This binding then affects the opening of ion channels, thereby decreasing turgor pressure in the stomata and causing them to close. Recent studies, by Gonzalez-Villagra, et al., have showed how ABA levels increased in drought-stressed plants (2018). They showed that when plants were placed in a stressful situation they produced more ABA to try to conserve any water they had in their leaves. Another extremely important factor in dealing with drought stress and regulating the uptake and export of water is aquaporins (AQPs). AQPs are integral membrane proteins that make up channels. These channels' main job is the transport of water and other essential solutes. AQPs are both transcriptionally and post-transcriptionally regulated by many different factors such as ABA, GA3, pH and Ca2+; and the specific levels of AQPs in certain parts of the plant, such as roots or leaves, helps to draw as much water into the plant as possible. By understanding the mechanisms of both AQPs and the hormone ABA, scientists will be better able to produce drought-resistant plants in the future.

It is interesting that plants that are consistently exposed to drought have been found to form a sort of "memory". A study by Tombesi et al., found that plants which had previously been exposed to drought were able to come up with a sort of strategy to minimize water loss and decrease water use. They found that plants which were exposed to drought conditions actually changed the way they regulated their stomata and what they called "hydraulic safety margin" so as to decrease the vulnerability of the plant. By changing the regulation of stomata and subsequently the transpiration, plants were able to function better when less water was available.

In animals
For animals, the most stressful of all the abiotic stressors is heat.  This is because many species are unable to regulate their internal body temperature.  Even in the species that are able to regulate their own temperature, it is not always a completely accurate system.  Temperature determines metabolic rates, heart rates, and other very important factors within the bodies of animals, so an extreme temperature change can easily distress the animal's body.  Animals can respond to extreme heat, for example, through natural heat acclimation or by burrowing into the ground to find a cooler space.

It is also possible to see in animals that a high genetic diversity is beneficial in providing resiliency against harsh abiotic stressors.  This acts as a sort of stock room when a species is plagued by the perils of natural selection.  A variety of galling insects are among the most specialized and diverse herbivores on the planet, and their extensive protections against abiotic stress factors have helped the insect in gaining that position of honor.

In endangered species
Biodiversity is determined by many things, and one of them is abiotic stress.  If an environment is highly stressful, biodiversity tends to be low.  If abiotic stress does not have a strong presence in an area, the biodiversity will be much higher.

This idea leads into the understanding of how abiotic stress and endangered species are related.  It has been observed through a variety of environments that as the level of abiotic stress increases, the number of species decreases.  This means that species are more likely to become population threatened, endangered, and even extinct, when and where abiotic stress is especially harsh.

See also
Ecophysiology

References

Stress (biological and psychological)
Biodiversity
Habitat
Agriculture
Botany